365th may refer to:

365th Bombardment Squadron, inactive United States Air Force unit
365th Electronic Warfare Group previously 1st Search Attack Group, United States Army Air Forces unit that served during World War II. 365 EWG was a 'paper' designation given to the unit when it did not have physical form, equipment, or personnel.
365th Fighter Group or 132nd Fighter Wing (132d W), United States Air Force unit assigned to the Iowa Air National Guard
365th Fighter Squadron or 163rd Fighter Squadron, unit of the Indiana Air National Guard 122nd Fighter Wing

See also
365 (number)
365 (disambiguation)
365, the year 365 (CCCLXV) of the Julian calendar
365 BC